Ecdysis is the first solo album by Japanese musician Miho Hatori. She came to prominence with a series of contributions to diverse bands, including Cibo Matto, Gorillaz, the Beastie Boys, and Smokey & Miho before working entirely as a solo performer. The album was released on October 21, 2005 in Japan under the Speedstar International label. The album was distributed in the United States one year later under the Rykodisc label.

Album title

Track listing
"Ecdysis" – 4:26
"A Song for Kids" – 3:30
"In Your Arms" – 4:06
"Barracuda" – 3:13
"The Spirit of Juliet" – 4:11
"Walking City" – 3:38
"Sweet Samsara Part I" – 3:41
"Sweet Samsara Part II" – 2:59
"Today Is Like That" – 3:46
"The River of 3 Crossings" – 3:49
"Amazona" – 1:58

Production

Personnel
Miho Hatori - vocals, synth, beats programs, tambourine, keyboard bass, melodica, Indian ankle bells, percussion, guitar, marxolin, harmonica, beats, shaker, keyboards
Mauro Rofosco - percussion
Sebastian Steinberg - bass
Thomas Bartlett - organ, piano, accordion, keyboards
Mark de gli Antoni - keyboards
Fer Isella - keyboards
Jon Birdsong - cornet, horns, percussion
Shelley Burgon - harp
Smokey Hormel - Rhode organ, fluto
Brandt Abner - Rhode organ

References

External links 
 

2005 debut albums
Albums produced by Miho Hatori